Dennhardt is a surname. Notable people with the surname include:

Christine Hohmann-Dennhardt (born 1950), German politician and judge
Frank Dennhardt (born 1967), German tennis player
Julius H. Dennhardt (1869–1929),  American auctioneer, businessman and politician
Oskar-Hubert Dennhardt (1915–2014), German Major in the Wehrmacht during World War II

See also 
Denhardt